No Place for Jennifer is a 1950 British film directed by Henry Cass and starring Leo Genn, Rosamund John, Guy Middleton and Janette Scott.

It was based on the novel No Difference to Me by Phyllis Hambleton.

Plot
In the film, a young girl experiences trauma when her parents divorce.

Cast
 Leo Genn as William
 Rosamund John as Rachel Kershaw
 Beatrice Campbell as Paula
 Guy Middleton as Brian Stewart
 Janette Scott as Jennifer
 Anthony Nicholls as Baxter
 Jean Cadell as Aunt Jacqueline
 Megs Jenkins as Mrs Marshall
 Philip Ray as Mr Marshall
 Edith Sharpe as Doctor
 Ann Codrington as Miss Hancock
 Brian Smith as Martin Marshall
 André Morell as Counsel
Anthony Wager as Ted
William Simons as Jeremy

Critical reception
Bosley Crowther wrote in The New York Times, "a tepid but touching little drama...Henry Cass has directed it primly, in a warm tea-and-crumpets style, and the little girl plays it devoutly."

References

External links

1950 films
1950 drama films
British drama films
Films directed by Henry Cass
British black-and-white films
Films with screenplays by J. Lee Thompson
Films based on novels
Films about divorce
1950s English-language films
1950s British films